Desires of the Heart may refer to:
 Desires of the Heart (2008 film), a Chinese romantic comedy film
 Desires of the Heart (2013 film), an English independent film